Monte Porzio is a comune (municipality) in the Province of Pesaro e Urbino in the Italian region Marche, located about  west of Ancona and about  southeast of Pesaro.

Monte Porzio borders the following municipalities: Corinaldo, Mondavio,   San Costanzo, Terre Roveresche, Trecastelli. It is an agricultural and industrial center on the hills of the left bank of the lower Val Cesano. In the 19th century it was renowned for the production of scissors.

References

External links

Cities and towns in the Marche